"Baby Be Mine" is a song by American R&B group Blackstreet. The song, which was recorded for the group's self-titled debut album (1994), was released as the debut single for the album and in promotion for the soundtrack to the 1993 film CB4 in February 1993.

The single version features Joseph Stonestreet's original lead vocal. The album version has slightly different lyrics, a different mix, and features Dave Hollister on lead.

Track listing

 12", Vinyl
"Baby Be Mine" (12" Remix) - 5:56
"Baby Be Mine" (Hip Hop Mix) - 3:40
"Baby Be Mine" (Club Mix) - 4:39

 12", Vinyl (Promo)
"Baby Be Mine" (Vocal) - 5:52
"Baby Be Mine" (Percapella) - 4:06
"Baby Be Mine" (Dub 1) - 5:52
"Baby Be Mine" (Instrumental) - 5:50
"Baby Be Mine" (Bonus Beats) - 4:06
"Baby Be Mine" (Acapella) - 4:05

 CD, Maxi
"Baby Be Mine" (12" Remix) - 5:56
"Baby Be Mine" (Hip Hop Mix) - 3:40
"Baby Be Mine" (Album Version) - 4:06
"Baby Be Mine" (Club Mix) - 4:39

Personnel
executive production – Nelson George, Kathy Nelson, Bill Stephney
production – Teddy Riley, "Lil" Chris Smith

Charts

References

External links
 

1993 debut singles
Blackstreet songs
Song recordings produced by Teddy Riley
1993 songs
MCA Records singles
Songs written by Teddy Riley
Hip hop soul songs